Starke County is a county in the U.S. state of Indiana. As of the 2020 United States Census, the population was 23,371. The county seat is Knox.

History
The Indiana State Legislature passed an omnibus county bill on 7 February 1835 that authorized the creation of thirteen counties in northeast Indiana, including Starke. The county government organization commenced in 1850. It was named for Gen. John Stark, who commanded New Hampshire troops at the Battle of Bunker Hill in 1775 in the American Revolutionary War, and who defeated the British at the Battle of Bennington in 1777.

Before white settlement, all of the land that forms modern-day Starke County and adjacent LaPorte County to the north was inhabited by the Potawatami Indian nation. These groups were forcibly removed to Kansas by the United States government in 1838, and many died on what has been called the Potawatomi Trail of Death.

When Starke County was created, it included the present LaPorte County townships of Cass, Dewey, Hanna, and Prairie. It was necessary for residents in this area to travel some distance east to Lemon's Bridge to cross the Kankakee River in order to travel south to the center of the county, the future site of the county seat at Knox. Therefore, because they were effectively isolated from the rest of Starke county, residents north of the river petitioned to be annexed to LaPorte county and this was done on January 28, 1842.

Name
Despite being named for General John Stark and originally being known and appearing on maps as Stark County when initially created and organized, an e was added to the county's name fairly early in its history. There does not seem to be any solid evidence to clearly explain this alteration. Three possible explanations have been advanced: an early scribe had 'fancy lettering', including a k with a long tail or flourish that appeared to others as ke, the new spelling sticking; General Stark himself may have used a similar flourish at the end of his signature; which became a point of confusion to Indiana officials (This seems unlikely, since Stark County in Ohio (1808) and Illinois (1839) both preceded Starke County, Indiana and offered clear precedence and guidance on the spelling of the name, not to mention other numerous settlements within the United States named after the General also preceding Starke County.); it is thought that the change occurred around 1860 as the result of a clerical error by an official in Indianapolis.

Geography
Starke County consists of low rolling hills covered with vegetation or brush. Its boundaries include three prominences that rise to 780' (238m) ASL: two adjacent swells 0.6 mile (1.0 km) NE of Bass Lake, and a small ridge 3.0 miles (4.8 km) ESE of Bass Lake.

The northwestern boundary of Starke County is defined by the Kankakee River; the Yellow River, a tributary of the Kankakee, flows through the central part of the county, past Knox.

Major highways

Adjacent counties

Municipalities
The municipalities in Starke County, and their populations as of the 2010 Census, are:

Cities and towns

Census-designated places

Unincorporated communities

Townships
The nine townships of Starke County, with their populations as of the 2010 Census, are:

Education
Public schools in Starke County are administered by four different districts:
 Culver Community Schools
 Knox Community School Corporation
 North Judson-San Pierre Schools
 Oregon-Davis School Corporation

Hospitals
 Indiana University Health Starke Hospital

Climate and weather

Government

The county government is a constitutional body, granted specific powers by the Constitution of Indiana and the Indiana Code.

County Council: The county council is the legislative branch of the county government and controls spending and revenue collection in the county. Representatives are elected from county districts to four-year terms. They are responsible for setting salaries, the annual budget, and special spending. The council has limited authority to impose local taxes, in the form of an income and property tax that is subject to state level approval, excise taxes, and service taxes.

Board of Commissioners: The executive body of the county, the commissioners are elected county-wide to staggered four-year terms. One commissioner serves as president. The commissioners execute the acts legislated by the council, collect revenue, and manage the functions of the county government.

Court: The judge on the court is elected to a term of six years. The judge is assisted by a magistrate who is appointed by the judge. The court handles criminal and civil cases, and has a small claims division. In some cases, court decisions can be appealed to the state level circuit court.

County Officials: The county has other elected offices, including sheriff, coroner, auditor, treasurer, recorder, surveyor, and circuit court clerk, elected to four-year terms. Members elected to county government positions are required to declare party affiliations and to be residents of the county.

Starke County is part of Indiana's 2nd congressional district in the United States House of Representatives; a district that has been represented by Jackie Walorski since January 2013.

In presidential elections, Starke County was a bellwether county for a time, voting for the winner in every election from 1964 to 2008.

Demographics

As of the 2010 United States Census, there were 23,363 people, 9,038 households, and 6,484 families in the county. The racial makeup of the county was 97.1% white, 0.3% American Indian, 0.3% black or African American, 0.2% Asian, 0.9% from other races, and 1.3% from two or more races. Those of Hispanic or Latino origin made up 3.3% of the population. In terms of ancestry, 27.2% were German, 16.3% were Irish, 8.9% were English, 8.7% were American, and 6.9% were Polish.

Of the 9,038 households, 32.7% had children under the age of 18 living with them, 54.2% were married couples living together, 11.7% had a female householder with no husband present, 28.3% were non-families, and 23.5% of all households were made up of individuals. The average household size was 2.58 and the average family size was 3.02. The median age was 40.4 years.

The median income for a household in the county was $47,697 and the median income for a family was $44,044. Males had a median income of $37,507 versus $28,628 for females. The per capita income for the county was $17,991. About 12.9% of families and 15.7% of the population were below the poverty line, including 25.1% of those under age 18 and 7.0% of those age 65 or over.

See also
 National Register of Historic Places listings in Starke County, Indiana

References

External links

 
Indiana counties
1850 establishments in Indiana
Northwest Indiana
Populated places established in 1850
Sundown towns in Indiana